Isaac Elie (born 24 November 1928) is a Sudanese hurdler. He competed in the men's 110 metres hurdles at the 1960 Summer Olympics.

References

External links
 

1928 births
Possibly living people
Athletes (track and field) at the 1960 Summer Olympics
Sudanese male hurdlers
Olympic athletes of Sudan